The McLachlan's girdled lizard or McLachlan's spiny-tailed lizard (Cordylus mclachlani) is a species of lizard in the Cordylidae family endemic to South Africa.

References

Cordylus
Reptiles of South Africa
Reptiles described in 1986
Taxa named by Pieter Le Fras Nortier Mouton
Taxonomy articles created by Polbot